Horia is a Romanian-language male name that may refer to:
 Horia Agarici
 Horia Bernea
 Horia Bonciu
 Horia Brenciu
 Horia Creangă
 Horia Colibășanu
 Horia Damian
 Horia Demian
 Horia Furtună
 Horia Gârbea
 Horia Hulubei
 Horia Macellariu
 Horia Moculescu
 Horia-Roman Patapievici
 Horia Sima
 Horia Tecău

Romanian masculine given names